Balbec is an unincorporated community in Penn Township, Jay County, Indiana.

History
A post office was established at Balbec in 1865, and remained in operation until it was discontinued in 1919. The community was likely named after Baalbek, in Lebanon.

References

Unincorporated communities in Jay County, Indiana
Unincorporated communities in Indiana